The discography of American country music singer Keith Whitley includes five studio albums, 10 compilation albums, one extended play and 20 singles. Of his singles, 15 reached the top 40 of the Billboard Hot Country Songs chart between 1986 and 1992, including five number one hits ("Don't Close Your Eyes", "When You Say Nothing at All", "I'm No Stranger to the Rain", "I Wonder Do You Think of Me" and "It Ain't Nothin'"). Four of his albums have been certified Gold or Platinum by the RIAA in the U.S.

Studio albums

Compilation albums

Tribute albums

Extended plays

Singles

Music videos

References

Discographies of American artists
Country music discographies